Munger Airport (also known as  Safyabad Airport) is an airport located in Munger district in the Indian state of Bihar. The airport is situated at Saifabad, 5 km from the district headquarters of Munger. It is controlled by the Airports Authority of India.

History
Munger airport is 90 years old. In January 2015, then Chief Minister of the state, Jitan Ram Manjhi announced to develop the airport and start domestic flights. In March 2015, airport renovation work was given to Bihar Rajya Bhavan Nirmaan Nigam. Airport renovation was done at the cost of ₹ 8 crore. Renovated airport lounge and runway was inaugurated by Chief Minister Nitish Kumar on 24 May 2016.

See also 
 List of airports in Bihar

References 

Airports in Bihar
Munger district
2016 establishments in Bihar
Airports established in 2016